Vidraru Dam is a dam in Romania. It was completed in 1966 on the Argeș River and creates Lake Vidraru. The arch dam was built with the primary purpose to produce hydroelectricity. The dam's height is 166 metres, the arch length 305 meters and it can store 465 million cubic metres of water. The reservoir has a total shoreline (perimeter) length of 28 km.

Background

Situated between Frunții Mountains and Ghițu mountains, the lake collects the Capra, Buda, and some other smaller rivers (Râul Doamnei, Cernatu, Vâlsan, Topolog, Valea lui Stan, and Limpedea), with a total flow of about 5.5 million L/s. The total surface of the lake is 3,930,000 sq m, 10.3 km in length, with a maximum width of 2.2 km in the Valea Lupului – Călugărița zone. Normal level or water retention is 830 metres above  sea level (mdM). 

The dam's construction took 5 and a half years. It required 42 km of tunnels, excavation of 1,768,000 cubic metres of hard rocks, out of which approximatively 1 million had to be extracted from underground, 930,000 cubic metres of concrete, out of which  400,000 cubic metres were underground and required the installation of 6,300 tons of electro-mechanical equipment.

When completed, it ranked 5th in Europe, and 9th in the world. In an average hydrological year it can generate approximately of 400 GWh/year. As of 2019, Vidraru Dam is the 16th tallest dam in Europe.

The Vidraru Hydro Power Plant has an installed capacity of 220 MW.

See also
 Energy in Romania

References

Gallery

External links

 dams.go.ro
 BARAJUL-VIDRARU

Dams in Romania
Buildings and structures in Argeș County
Dams completed in 1965